La Vielle Fille may refer to:
La Vieille Fille (novel), 1836 novel
La Vieille Fille (film), 1972 French film